WDIC was a Country-formatted broadcast radio station licensed to Clinchco, Virginia, serving Clinchco and Dickenson County, Virginia. WDIC was last owned and operated by Dickenson County Broadcasting Corporation. Its license was surrendered and cancelled on September 30, 2020.

References

External links
 FCC Station Search Details: DWDIC (Facility ID: 16904)
 FCC History Cards for WDIC (covering 1959-1981)

DIC (AM)
1961 establishments in Virginia
Radio stations established in 1961
Radio stations disestablished in 2020
2020 disestablishments in Virginia
DIC
Defunct radio stations in the United States